Maclay Mansion, also known as Rosehill Seminary and Gleim Mansion, is a historic home located at Tipton, Moniteau County, Missouri.  It was built between about 1858 and 1860, and is a -story, five bay, "L"-plan, orange-red brick dwelling.  The main block measures approximately 45 feet by 36 feet and is topped by a gable roof.  The house features a three bay hip roofed front portico, massive end chimneys, a wide, bracketed cornice, and a two-story rear gallery.

It was added to the National Register of Historic Places in 1979.

References

Houses on the National Register of Historic Places in Missouri
Houses completed in 1860
Buildings and structures in Moniteau County, Missouri
National Register of Historic Places in Moniteau County, Missouri